Thyme is the herb (dried aerial parts) of some members of the genus Thymus of aromatic perennial evergreen herbs in the mint family Lamiaceae. Thymes are relatives of the oregano genus Origanum, with both plants being mostly indigenous to the Mediterranean region. Thymes have culinary, medicinal, and ornamental uses, and the species most commonly cultivated and used for culinary purposes is Thymus vulgaris.

History 

Thyme is indigenous to the Mediterranean region. Wild thyme grows in the Levant, where it might have been first cultivated. Ancient Egyptians used thyme for embalming.  The ancient Greeks used it in their baths and burnt it as incense in their temples, believing it was a source of courage.  The spread of thyme throughout Europe was thought to be due to the Romans, as they used it to purify their rooms and to "give an aromatic flavour to cheese and liqueurs". In the European Middle Ages, the herb was placed beneath pillows to aid sleep and ward off nightmares.  In this period, women also often gave knights and warriors gifts that included thyme leaves, as it was believed to bring courage to the bearer. Thyme was also used as incense and placed on coffins during funerals, as it was supposed to assure passage into the next life.

The name of the genus of fish Thymallus, first given to the grayling (T. thymallus, described in the 1758 edition of Systema Naturae by Swedish zoologist Carl Linnaeus), originates from the faint smell of thyme that emanates from the flesh.

Cultivation 
Thyme is best cultivated in a hot, sunny location with well-drained soil.  It is generally planted in the spring, and thereafter grows as a perennial.  It can be propagated by seed, cuttings, or dividing rooted sections of the plant.  It tolerates drought well.  The plant can take deep freezes and is found growing wild on mountain highlands. It grows well on dry slopes and is propagated by cuttings. It can be pruned after flowering to keep from getting woody.

Aroma components
Gas chromatographic analysis reveals that the most abundant volatile component of thyme leaves is thymol 8.55 mg/g.  Other components are carvacrol, linalool, α-terpineol, and 1,8-cineole.  Several are also found in basil.  Some exhibit antioxidant properties.

Culinary use 

In some Levantine countries, the condiment za'atar (Arabic for both thyme and marjoram) contains many of the essential oils found in thyme. Thyme is a common component of the bouquet garni, and of herbes de Provence.

Thyme is sold both fresh and dried. While summer-seasonal, fresh greenhouse thyme is often available year-round. The fresh form is more flavourful, but also less convenient; storage life is rarely more than a week. However, the fresh form can last many months if carefully frozen.

Fresh thyme is commonly sold in bunches of sprigs. A sprig is a single stem snipped from the plant. A recipe may measure thyme by the bunch (or fraction thereof), or by the sprig, or by the tablespoon or teaspoon. Dried thyme is widely used in Armenia in tisanes (called urc).

Depending on how it is used in a dish, the whole sprig may be used (e.g., in a bouquet garni), or the leaves removed and the stems discarded. Usually, when a recipe specifies "bunch" or "sprig", it means the whole form; when it specifies spoons, it means the leaves. It is perfectly acceptable to substitute dried for whole thyme.

Leaves may be removed from stems either by scraping with the back of a knife, or by pulling through the fingers or tines of a fork.

Thyme retains its flavour on drying better than many other herbs.

Antimicrobial properties 

Oil of thyme, the essential oil of common thyme (Thymus vulgaris), contains 20–54% thymol.  Thyme essential oil also contains a range of additional compounds, such as p-cymene, myrcene, borneol, and linalool. Thymol, an antiseptic, is an active ingredient in various commercially produced mouthwashes such as Listerine.  Before the advent of modern antibiotics, oil of thyme was used to medicate bandages.

Important species and cultivars 

 Thymus citriodorus – various lemon thymes, orange thymes, lime thyme
 Thymus herba-barona (caraway thyme) is used both as a culinary herb and a ground cover, and has a very strong caraway scent due to the chemical carvone.
 Thymus praecox  (mother of thyme, wild thyme), is cultivated as an ornamental.
 Thymus pseudolanuginosus (woolly thyme) is not a culinary herb, but is grown as a ground cover.
 Thymus serpyllum (wild thyme, creeping thyme) is an important nectar source plant for honeybees. All thyme species are nectar sources, but wild thyme covers large areas of droughty, rocky soils in southern Europe (both Greece and Malta are especially famous for wild thyme honey) and North Africa, as well as in similar landscapes in the Berkshire and Catskill Mountains of the northeastern US. The lowest growing of the widely used thyme is good for walkways. It is also an important caterpillar food plant for large and common blue butterflies.
 Thymus vulgaris (common thyme, English thyme, summer thyme, winter thyme, French thyme, or garden thyme) is a commonly used culinary herb. It also has medicinal uses. Common thyme is a Mediterranean perennial which is best suited to well-drained soils and full sun.

References

Further reading 

 S. S. Tawfik, M. I. Abbady, Ahmed M. Zahran and A. M. K. Abouelalla. Therapeutic Efficacy Attained with Thyme Essential Oil Supplementation Throughout γ-irradiated Rats. Egypt. J. Rad. Sci. Applic., 19(1): 1-22 (2006). 
 Flora of China: Thymus
 Flora Europaea: Thymus
 Rohde, E. S. (1920). A Garden of Herbs.
 Easter, M. (2009).  International Thymus Register and Checklist.

Herbs
Antifungals
Antiseptics
Medicinal plants
Flora of the Mediterranean Basin
Mediterranean cuisine
Lamiaceae
Melliferous flowers
Subshrubs
Albanian cuisine